11 points in the Negev ( or , Akhat-Esre HaNekudot) refers to a Jewish Agency plan to establish 11 settlements in the Negev in 1946 prior to the partition of Palestine and the establishment of the State of Israel.

History

A plan to establish eleven "points" of Jewish settlement in the Negev was devised to assure a Jewish presence in the area prior to the partition of Palestine. That followed the publication of the Morrison-Grady Plan, a partition proposal in which the Negev was to be part of an Arab state. Together, the Jewish National Fund, the Jewish Agency, the Haganah and the Mekorot water company launched a drive to settle the Negev and hopefully to have the Negev included as part of a Jewish state.

On the night of October 5–6, after the Yom Kippur fast, the settlers, including members of  Kibbutz Ruhama and Gvulot, set up camp at eleven pre-determined locations in the Negev. The eleven settlements were (in alphabetic order):

Be'eri
Gal On
Hatzerim
Kedma
Kfar Darom
Mishmar HaNegev
Nevatim
Nirim
Shoval
Tkuma
Urim

Legacy and commemoration
Today a museum celebrating the eleven points is located in Revivim. In 1996 Israel Post released a stamp celebrating the fiftieth anniversary of their settlement.

See also
Three lookouts
Blueprint Negev

References

External links 
 "The great drift", The Jerusalem Post, 25 January 2007

1946 in Mandatory Palestine
Negev
Settlement schemes in Mandatory Palestine